Gilbert White Ganong (May 22, 1851 – October 31, 1917) was a Canadian politician, the 14th Lieutenant Governor of New Brunswick and co-founder of Ganong Bros. Limited, candy makers in the town of St. Stephen.

Born in Springfield, New Brunswick the son of Francis Daniel Ganong and Deborah Ruth Kierstead, he was a descendant of Jean Guenon, a Huguenot exile from La Rochelle, France who settled in New Amsterdam during the second half of the 17th century then several generations later following the American Revolutionary War, some of Guenon's antecedents were United Empire Loyalists who settled in New Brunswick (then part of Nova Scotia) in 1783.

In 1873, Gilbert Ganong co-founded Ganong Bros. Limited with his brother James.

In 1896, he was elected to the House of Commons of Canada for the riding of Charlotte. A Liberal-Conservative, he was re-elected in 1900 and 1904, but was defeated in 1908.

On June 29, 1917, he was appointed Lieutenant Governor of New Brunswick and served until his death in October. His death was due to "intestinal toxemia complications with nephritis". He was 66 years of age.

References 
 
 

1851 births
1917 deaths
Canadian Baptists
Chocolatiers
Gilbert
Conservative Party of Canada (1867–1942) MPs
Lieutenant Governors of New Brunswick
Members of the House of Commons of Canada from New Brunswick
Businesspeople from New Brunswick
People from St. Stephen, New Brunswick
19th-century Baptists